Original sin is humanity's original state of sinfulness resulting from the Fall of Man.

Original Sin or The Original Sin may also refer to:

Film 
 The Original Sin, a 1948 German comedy
 Original Sin, a 1992 Japanese film by Takashi Ishii
 Original Sin, a 2001 film starring Angelina Jolie and Antonio Banderas
 Original Sin – The Seven Sins, a 2021 short film directed by Amy Tinkham

Literature 
 The Original Sin, a 1972 autobiography by Anthony Quinn
 "Original Sin", a 1972 short story by Vernor Vinge
 Original Sin, a 1994 novel by P.D. James
 Original Sin, a 1995 Doctor Who novel by Andy Lane
 Original Sin: Illuminating the Riddle, a 1997 theological monograph by Henri Blocher
 Original Sin, a 2014 Marvel Comics storyline

Music
 The Original Sins, an American punk band

Albums
 Original Sin, a 1961 studio album by John Lewis
 The Original Sin, a 1979 studio album by Cowboys International
 Original Sin, a 1989 studio album by Pandora's Box
 Original Sin, a 2010 studio album by INXS
 Original Sin – The Collection, a 2004 compilation album by INXS

Songs
 "Original Sin" (1980) by Theatre of Hate
 "Original Sin" (1983) by INXS
 "Original Sin" (1994) by Taylor Dayne, covered by Meat Loaf
 "Original Sin" (2002) by Elton John

Television
 "Original Sin", an episode of The Vampire Diaries
 "Original Sin", the pilot episode of Medici: Masters of Florence

Other uses 
 Original sin, a metaphor in economics literature
 Divinity: Original Sin, a 2014 video game

See also 
 Fall of man, the Christian narrative encompassing the entire story of original sin
 The Garden of Eden with the Fall of Man, a 1617 painting by Peter Paul Rubens
 The Original Sinn or Nick Cvjetkovich, Canadian professional wrestler